This is a list of yearly Massachusetts State Collegiate Athletic Conference football standings.

Massachusetts State Collegiate Athletic Conference standings

References

Massachusetts State Collegiate Athletic Conference
Standings